Hezar may refer to:

 Mount Hezar, in Iran
 Hezar, Fars, a village in Iran
 Hezar, Oman, a village in Oman

See also 
 
 Hazar (disambiguation)